The dorsal carpal branch of the radial artery (posterior radial carpal artery) is a small vessel which arises beneath the extensor tendons of the thumb; crossing the carpus transversely toward the medial border of the hand, it anastomoses with the dorsal carpal branch of the ulnar artery.

The dorsal branch of the radial artery also branches into the dorsalis pollicis artery; more distally it branches into the princeps pollicis artery, and anastomoses with perforating branches of the deep palmar arch

References

External links
  - "Dorsum of the hand, deep dissection, posterior view"

Arteries of the upper limb